HexPS may stand for:
 Hexaprenyl diphosphate synthase (geranylgeranyl-diphosphate specific), an enzyme
 Hexaprenyl-diphosphate synthase ((2E,6E)-farnesyl-diphosphate specific), an enzyme